Galactomyces reessii is a yeast belonging to the genus Galactomyces.

It contains an enzyme that converts 3-methylcrotonic acid to 3-hydroxy-3-methylbutyric acid aka β-hydroxy β-methylbutyric acid. It can also have an enzyme that dissolves pectin.

Galactomyces reessii lives naturally in soil and on decaying vegetable matter.
Galactomyces reessii does not consume D-mannitol.  It cannot ferment glucose.

References

Saccharomycetes